Norman Robert Foster, Baron Foster of Thames Bank,  (born 1 June 1935) is a British architect and designer. Closely associated with the development of high-tech architecture, Foster is recognised as a key figure in British modernist architecture. His architectural practice Foster + Partners, first founded in 1967 as Foster Associates, is the largest in the United Kingdom, and maintains offices internationally. He is the president of the Norman Foster Foundation, created to 'promote interdisciplinary thinking and research to help new generations of architects, designers and urbanists to anticipate the future'. The foundation, which opened in June 2017, is based in Madrid and operates globally.

Early life and education
He was the only child of Robert and Lilian Foster (née Smith). The family moved to Levenshulme, near Manchester, where they lived in poverty. His father was a machine painter at the Metropolitan-Vickers works in Trafford Park, which influenced Norman to take up engineering, design, and, ultimately, architecture. His mother worked in a local bakery. Foster's parents were diligent and hard workers who often had neighbours and family members look after her son, which Foster later believed restricted his relationship with his mother and father.

Foster attended Burnage Grammar School for Boys in Burnage, where he was bullied by fellow pupils and took up reading. He considered himself quiet and awkward in his early years. At 16, he left school and passed an entrance exam for a trainee scheme set up by Manchester Town Hall, which led to his first job, an office junior and clerk in the treasurer's department. In 1953, Foster completed his national service in the Royal Air Force, choosing the air force because aircraft had been a longtime hobby. Upon returning to Manchester, Foster went against his parents' wishes and sought employment elsewhere. He had seven O-levels by this time, and applied to work at a duplicating machine company, telling the interviewer he had applied for the prospect of a company car and a £1,000 salary. Instead, he became an assistant to a contract manager at a local architects, John E. Beardshaw and Partners. The staff advised him that if he wished to become an architect, he should prepare a portfolio of drawings using the perspective and shop drawings from Beardshaw's practice as an example. Beardshaw was so impressed with Foster's drawings that he promoted him to the drawing department.

In 1956, Foster began study at the School of Architecture and City Planning, part of the University of Manchester. He was ineligible for a maintenance grant, so he took part-time jobs to fund his studies, including an ice-cream salesman, bouncer, and night shifts at a bakery making crumpets. During this time, he also studied at the local library in Levenshulme. His talent and hard work was recognised in 1959 when he won £105 and a RIBA silver medal for what he described as "a measured drawing of a windmill". The windmill he drew was Bourn Windmill, Cambridgeshire. After graduating in 1961, Foster won the Henry Fellowship to Yale School of Architecture in New Haven, Connecticut, where he met future business partner Richard Rogers and earned his master's degree. At the suggestion of Vincent Scully, the pair travelled across America for a year.

Career

1960s–1980s

In 1963, Foster returned to the UK and established his own architectural practice, Team 4, with Rogers, Su Brumwell, and the sisters Georgie and Wendy Cheesman. Among their first projects was the Cockpit, a minimalist glass bubble installed in Cornwall, the features of which became a recurring theme in Foster's future projects. After the four separated in 1967, Foster and Wendy founded a new practice, Foster Associates. From 1968 to 1983, Foster collaborated with American architect Richard Buckminster Fuller on several projects that became catalysts in the development of an environmentally sensitive approach to design, such as the Samuel Beckett Theatre at St Peter's College, Oxford.

Foster Associates concentrated on industrial buildings until 1969, when the practice worked on the administrative and leisure centre for Fred. Olsen Lines based in the London Docklands, which integrated workers and managers within the same office space. This was followed, in 1970, by the world's first inflatable office building for Computer Technology Limited near Hemel Hempstead, which housed 70 employees for a year. The practice's breakthrough project in England followed in 1974 with the completion of the Willis Faber & Dumas headquarters in Ipswich, commissioned in 1970 and completed in 1975. The client, a family-run insurance company, wanted to restore a sense of community to the workplace. In response, Foster designed a space with modular, open plan office floors, long before open-plan became the norm, and placed a roof garden, 25-metre swimming pool, and gymnasium in the building to enhance the quality of life for the company's 1,200 employees. The building has a full-height glass façade moulded to the medieval street plan and contributes drama, subtly shifting from opaque, reflective black to a glowing back-lit transparency as the sun sets. The design was inspired by the Daily Express Building in Manchester that Foster had admired as a youngster. The building is now Grade I listed. The Sainsbury Centre for Visual Arts, an art gallery and museum on the campus of the University of East Anglia, Norwich, was one of the first major public buildings to be designed by Foster, completed in 1978, and became grade II* listed in December 2012.

In 1981, Foster received a commission for the construction of a new terminal building at London's Stansted Airport. Executed by Foster + Partners, the building, recognised as a landmark work of high-tech architecture, was opened to the public in 1991, and was awarded the 1990 European Union Prize for Contemporary Architecture / Mies van der Rohe Award. As part of the project's development, in 1988 Foster and British artist Brian Clarke made several proposals for an integral stained glass artwork for the terminal building; the principal proposal would have seen the walls of the terminal's east and west elevations clad in two sequences of traditionally mouth-blown, leaded glass. For complex technical and security reasons, the original scheme, which Clarke considered to be his magnum opus, couldn't be executed. Though unrealised, the collaboration is historically significant for its scale, its introduction of colour and materials broadly viewed as antithetical to high-tech architecture into a key work of that movement, and for having been the first time in the history of stained glass that computer-assisted design had been utilised in the creative process.

Foster gained a reputation for designing office buildings. In the 1980s he designed the HSBC Main Building in Hong Kong for the Hongkong and Shanghai Banking Corporation (a founding member of the future HSBC Holdings plc), at the time the most expensive building ever constructed. The building is marked by its high level of light transparency, as all 3500 workers have a view to Victoria Peak or Victoria Harbour. Foster said that if the firm had not won the contract it would probably have been bankrupted.

1990s–present

Foster was assigned the brief for a development on the site of the Baltic Exchange, which had been damaged beyond repair by an IRA bomb, in the 1990s. Foster + Partners submitted a plan for a  skyscraper, the London Millennium Tower, but its height was seen as excessive for London's skyline. The proposal was scrapped and instead Foster proposed 30 St Mary Axe, popularly referred to as "the gherkin", after its shape. Foster worked with engineers to integrate complex computer systems with the most basic physical laws, such as convection. In 1999, the company was renamed Foster + Partners.

By then, Foster's style had evolved from its earlier sophisticated, machine-influenced high-tech vision into a more sharp-edged modernity. In 2004, Foster designed the tallest bridge in the world, the Millau Viaduct in Southern France, with the Millau Mayor Jacques Godfrain stating; "The architect, Norman Foster, gave us a model of art."

Foster worked with Steve Jobs from about 2009 until Jobs' death to design the Apple offices, Apple Campus 2 (now called Apple Park), in Cupertino, California, US. Apple's board and staff continued to work with Foster as the design was completed and the construction in progress. The circular building was opened to employees in April 2017, six years after Jobs died in 2011.

In January 2007, the Sunday Times reported that Foster had called in Catalyst, a corporate finance house, to find buyers for Foster + Partners. Foster does not intend to retire, but rather to sell his 80–90% holding in the company valued at £300 million to £500 million. In 2007, he worked with Philippe Starck and Sir Richard Branson of the Virgin Group for the Virgin Galactic plans.

Foster currently sits on the board of trustees at architectural charity Article 25 who design, construct and manage innovative, safe, sustainable buildings in some of the most inhospitable and unstable regions of the world. He has also been on the Board of Trustees of The Architecture Foundation. Foster believes that attracting young talent is essential, and is proud that the average age of people working for Foster and Partners is 32, just like it was in 1967.

In May 2022, it was announced that Foster would help plan reconstruction in Ukraine after the end of the 2022 Russian invasion of Ukraine.

Personal life

Family
Foster has been married three times. His first wife, Wendy Cheesman, one of the four founders of Team 4, died from cancer in 1989. From 1991 to 1995, Foster was married to Begum Sabiha Rumani Malik. The marriage ended in divorce. In 1996, Foster married Spanish psychologist and art curator Elena Ochoa. He has five children; two of the four sons he had with Cheesman are adopted.

Health
In the 2000s, Foster was diagnosed with bowel cancer and was told he had weeks to live. He received chemotherapy treatment and made a full recovery. He also suffered a heart attack.

Honours
Foster was made a Knight Bachelor in the 1990 Birthday Honours, and thereby granted the title Sir. He was appointed to the Order of Merit (OM) in 1997. In the 1999 Birthday Honours, Foster's elevation to the peerage was announced and he was raised to the peerage as Baron Foster of Thames Bank, of Reddish in the County of Greater Manchester in July.

Foster was elected an Associate of the Royal Academy (ARA) on 19 May 1983, and a Royal Academician (RA) on 26 June 1991. In 1995, he was elected an Honorary Fellow of the Royal Academy of Engineering (HonFREng). On 24 April 2017, he was given the Freedom of the City of London. The Bloomberg London building received a Stirling Prize in October 2018.

Recognition
Foster received The Lynn S. Beedle Lifetime Achievement Award from the Council on Tall Buildings and Urban Habitat in 2007 to honour his contributions to the advancement of tall buildings.

He was awarded the Aga Khan Award for Architecture, for the University of Technology Petronas in Malaysia, and in 2008 he was granted an honorary degree from the Dundee School of Architecture at the University of Dundee. In 2009, he received the Prince of Asturias Award in the category 'Arts'. In 2017, he received the Golden Plate Award of the American Academy of Achievement presented by Awards Council member Lord Jacob Rothschild during the International Achievement Summit in London. In 2012, Foster was among the British cultural figures selected by artist Sir Peter Blake to appear in a new version of his most famous artwork – the Beatles' Sgt. Pepper's Lonely Hearts Club Band album cover – to celebrate the British cultural figures of his life that he most admires.

Works

See also

 Peter Rice
 SkyCycle (proposed transport project)

References

Bibliography

Documentaries
 How Much Does Your Building Weigh, Mr. Foster? (dir. Carlos Carcass and Norberto Lopez Amado, 2010, 78 minutes)
 Striving for Simplicity (Producer: Marc-Christoph Wagner, Copyright: Louisiana Channel, Louisiana Museum of Modern Art, 2015, 41 minutes)

External links

 Foster + Partners official website
 
 Interview with Norman Foster(video)
 Foster's projects on the map
 TED Talks: Norman Foster's green agenda at TED in 2007
  Norman Foster Foundation website

 
1935 births
Living people
Stirling Prize laureates
Alumni of the Manchester School of Architecture
20th-century English architects
English designers
Modernist architects from England
Pritzker Architecture Prize winners
Chartered designers
Foreign Members of the Russian Academy of Arts
Foster of Thames Bank, Norman Foster, Baron
Members of the Order of Merit
People from Reddish
Knights Commander of the Order of Merit of the Federal Republic of Germany
Members of the Academy of Arts, Berlin
Recipients of the Pour le Mérite (civil class)
High-tech architecture
Knights Bachelor
Recipients of the Royal Gold Medal
Members of the Académie d'architecture
Members of the European Academy of Sciences and Arts
Recipients of the Praemium Imperiale
Architects from Greater Manchester
Yale School of Architecture alumni
English expatriates in Switzerland
Royal Academicians
Honorary Fellows of the American Institute of Architects
Members of the Royal Swedish Academy of Arts
Life peers created by Elizabeth II